Alexis McKenzie Davis (born October 22, 1994) is an American softball coach and former player who is currently an assistant coach at Furman.

Career
Davis attended Porter Ridge High School in Indian Trail, North Carolina, where she was named ESPN High School National Softball Player of the Year in 2012. She later attended Auburn University, where she played pitcher. She holds Auburn's school softball record for most wins by a pitcher. During her senior season, Davis led the Tigers to the 2016 Women's College World Series final, where they fell to Oklahoma, 2–1.

Coaching career
In 2018, Davis was named an assistant coach at Furman.

References

External links 
 Auburn Tigers bio
 

1994 births
Living people
Auburn Tigers softball players
American softball coaches
Furman Paladins softball coaches
People from Union County, North Carolina
Sportspeople from Charlotte, North Carolina
Softball players from North Carolina